The Moto-Cardan was a V-twin engined motorcycle built by the Ader company in France in 1903. The Moto-Cardan was one of the first motorcycles to feature a drive shaft which delivered torque and rotation to the rear wheel.

External links 
 Close-up of V-twin motor 

Motorcycle manufacturers of France